Tech Town may refer to:
Tech Town (Detroit) or TechTown, an urban research and technology business park in Detroit, Michigan
Tech Town (Dayton), a technology district in Dayton, Ohio
Tech Town or Tektown, an unreleased game for the Power Glove
 Tech Town, a fictional store in episodes of Lab Rats